The 1990 Indiana Hoosiers football team represented Indiana University Bloomington as a member of the Big Ten Conference during the 1990 NCAA Division I-A football season. Led by seventh-year head coach Bill Mallory, the Hoosiers compiled an overall record of 6–5–1 with a mark of 3–4–1 in conference play, placing seventh the Big Ten. Indiana was invited to the Peach Bowl, where they lost to Auburn, 27–23. The team played home games at Memorial Stadium in Bloomington, Indiana.

Schedule

Personnel

1991 NFL draftees

References

Indiana
Indiana Hoosiers football seasons
Indiana Hoosiers football